Łącko  is a village in southern Poland situated in the Lesser Poland Voivodeship since 1999 (it was previously in Nowy Sącz Voivodeship from 1975 to 1998), famous from its apple orchards and traditional home-made slivovitz (Śliwowica Łącka).It is the capital of the White Gorals.

Notable people
Franciszek Maurer (1918 - 2010), Polish architect and professor

See also
Dunajec River
Nowy Targ
Zakopane

References

External links
 Jewish Community in Łącko on Virtual Shtetl

Villages in Nowy Sącz County